Téa Delgado is a fictional character from the American daytime drama One Life to Live. The role was portrayed by Florencia Lozano from January 27, 1997, to March 2, 2000, and briefly in 2002. Lozano returned to the role once again on December 5, 2008, and remained through the original television finale aired January 13, 2012. In April 2012, Lozano become the latest One Life to Live actress to join General Hospital with her alter ego. Scheduled to premiere in May, with Roger Howarth (Todd Manning) returning with her, she premiered on the series on May 9, 2012, last appearing December 3, 2012. Lozano reprised the role when daily episodes of One Life to Live debuted on Hulu, iTunes, and FX Canada via The Online Network April 29, 2013.

Téa was conceived as a character with a stern but passionate personality. She became one of the show's most popular characters and part of one of soap opera's most popular romances for her complex and volatile pairing with Todd Manning, a troubled and sometimes villainous character on the series. Soaps In Depth stated that Téa "set the small screen ablaze" during her time on One Life to Live.

Background

Character creation and portrayal
Téa Delgado was designed as the "tough-talking, yet soft-hearted attorney" of the series. The writers gave her a fragile personality, layering her as someone capable of showing great love and who is also "dying to be loved herself". One moment, Téa is seen as fiery and enraged; the next, she is witnessed as being soft-spoken and understanding. Having perfected these aspects of the character when paired with Roger Howarth's Todd Manning, actress Florencia Lozano acknowledged Howarth's help. "He's not an actor who's in his own world," she said. Todd had been romantically involved with Blair Cramer for some time already, and his divorce from her and custody pursuit of his daughter, Starr, soon positioned Lozano's character as a new love interest for Todd.

The pace of the soap opera was at times overwhelming for Lozano, and she looked for a way to manage this. "I try to keep feeding the fire, feeding some of the emotional stuff that Téa had to go through," she stated. "It's tiring because, on some level, I have to go there. I have to feel sad. I don't know any other way to do it." Detailing what she thinks about in order to produce onscreen tears, a query she often received from fans, Lozano stated, "Well...things that would make me cry. It's hard sometimes, but also it feels good when I feel like I portrayed something honestly." Having a good grasp on who Téa is provided Lozano with enough room to "make things up" even while keeping her character true to form. In addition, she looked to make each scene unique. "That's the thing about acting," she said. "When you're rehearsing over and over, how do you make it new every time? Well, it is new every time because it's the first time you've done it that time." Lozano saw each take as an opportunity to improve, rather than as something to be annoyed by, commenting, "I love it when we screw up, because we get another chance to do it, and every time it's a different scene." Lozano added, however, that she does enjoy perfecting her scenes. "It makes me really happy when I feel like I kicked ass in a scene," she stated.

Not every character action was originally in the script. "A lot of the times," Lozano said, "someone [would] make me laugh, and then my next line [would] be about responding to that. Any number of things [could] happen, which are usually the best moments. I [wanted] to be open to that. But it's hard, too, because I [didn't] want to screw up my lines." She further relayed, "There are many times when I think I didn't get a scene. When you don't feel anything, it's frustrating. I'm less hard on myself because I realize how difficult what we do is. But, as an actor, you hope that you go in there and get caught up in the moment. I think, self-indulgently, that's why we become actors in the first place — to feel things."

Todd and Téa
 
One Life to Live viewers originally resisted Todd being paired with anyone but Blair. Soap Opera Digest stated that Téa not only did not have any history with Todd, "she was breaking up One Life to Live's most popular (if unorthodox) duo". The magazine added that it was Lozano's "consistently strong and convincing portrayal" of Téa as the tough but soft attorney that won viewers over. Viewers saw immediate chemistry between Howarth and Lozano.

Todd and Téa's marriage is at first nothing more than a business deal; Todd offers Téa to be his wife and lawyer for $5 million to ensure custody of his daughter (Starr).  He is out for revenge against ex-wife Blair, feeling she ruined his chances at happiness when he returned to town after being presumed dead and discovered her having sex with Patrick Thornhart (Thorsten Kaye) on the floor of the penthouse he once shared with her. It is after this Todd shuts down emotionally, almost completely. He subsequently only shows kindness to his daughter and his sister (Victoria Lord), and occasionally to children. Soaps In Depth stated, "Téa being Todd's wife often put her in conflict with wife No. 1 and No. 2 — Blair." During one heated confrontation, the women's argument becomes physical. Lozano said "I'll never forget the time I crashed out the window. Kassie DePaiva (Blair) had to push me, and she was so nervous about really hurting me that I actually had to calm her down."

With Téa in his life, the writers had the emotional walls Todd had built around himself slowly collapse. As Soaps In Depth described it, Téa is the one who made Todd's heart "grow at least two sizes bigger". While Todd's tough bravado and insensitivity are lessened in Téa's presence, his reluctance to be sexually intimate becomes a prominent obstacle for the couple. After having felt betrayed by Blair with Patrick, Todd not only has trouble letting another woman into his psyche but also into his bed. This factor often causes Téa to be sexually frustrated while near Todd. Although they have agreed to keep their relationship platonic, she finds him sexually attractive and starts to desire him romantically. The writers often emphasized this, at one point having Téa strip down naked in front of Todd and plead for him to have sex with her, to which Todd painfully and angrily throws her out of their penthouse into the cold. He explains his reaction as being more about not being ready than actually rejecting Téa.

Todd and Téa's romance was written as tempestuous, star-crossed, loving, and abusive. The pairing would go from almost having sex one minute, to verbally abusing each other the next. Physical abuse takes place in one instance when Todd is on the run from the police and proceeds to kidnap Téa; he punches her out when she implies he will rape her as he had done to Marty Saybrooke (Susan Haskell) years earlier; Téa later knocks Todd out with a shovel to escape. However, during these scenes, the characters' love for each other continues to show; Todd releases a mournful, monstrous scream after having knocked Téa unconscious and relaxing her body on a chair in front of him, and Téa is seen to seemingly sexually desire Todd even while having tied him up after her attack on him. A disappointed Téa calls Todd a rapist after his kidnapping of her, which is a breaking point for Todd. She is one of the few people to believe that there is good in him. When she gives indication she now sees him as his enemies do, it is as much a slight to Todd's well-being as anything physical. "Téa called Todd a rapist," Lozano said. "By saying out loud that he's a rapist, it was the only way she could push him away. She needed those weapons, both verbal and emotional, to cut the tie because it had been so strong."

When working alongside Howarth, Lozano never felt as though she was simply reciting lines. She said, "I feel like we're just talking, listening and responding to each other. And that makes it relatively easy to concentrate. I feel like we're connecting." She called on her imagination, adding, "I do a lot of substituting. I think, 'What if Todd were a real person in my life?' The situations are so dramatic that in some ways it's easy to feel worked up."

Further differentiating Todd and Téa from other couples on the series was the application of theme music. Dark, sad but romantic theme music was applied to the pairing. Composer David Nichtern explained the emotion he wanted to convey. "This was kind of as close as we get to Todd 'romantic' music," he said. "It's still dark and mysterious, but has the possibility of a little sensuality and romance. I worked on these cues with my pal Kevin Bents (who does a lot of the keyboard work on the show) but when it came time for the demented variations, I just had to be alone (just kidding)."

Although Todd never expects to fall in love with Téa, he does. The marriage of convenience takes the characters on unexpected turns, both with intense feelings for each other. However, Todd struggles with his feelings for her based on his own troubled past and childhood. His obsession with destroying the Buchanan family (his sworn enemies, with the exception of a few) becomes too much for Téa to take. With Téa ready to divorce him, Todd soon "develops" split personalities in order to keep Téa in his life and get out of going to prison for holding 14 people hostage (the day he also kidnapped her). Téa begins to fall in love with Todd's perceived good alters. The writers had the couple divorce as part of Todd's defense strategy, but remarry after he was cleared of kidnapping charges. More heartbreak follows once Téa discovers he is faking his split personality disorder. Though the couple again reunite in 2000 and in 2002, they never manage to stay together for long. Téa returns to town in 2008, with the fact they share a daughter named Danielle.

While characters on the series have struggled to understand Téa's love for Todd, the writers made the pairing's love story detailed enough in its complexity for viewers to comprehend.

Storylines

1997–99
When lawyer Téa Delgado (Lozano) first sets foot in Llanview as one of its feistiest lawyers, it is because Carlotta Vega (Patricia Mauceri) has asked her to help defend Antonio Vega (Kamar de los Reyes). Antonio — Carlotta's son — has been charged with the murder of Carlo Hesser (Thom Christopher). Carlotta is naturally set on saving her son from prison. Téa helps clear Antonio of charges, meanwhile engaging in an intimate relationship with Kevin Buchanan (then portrayed by Kevin Stapleton, later Timothy Gibbs). She soon sets out to gain a job alongside Nora Buchanan (Hillary B. Smith). Nora declines to hire Téa. Téa, however, is determined to show Nora her law skills, even going so far as to seek to have Antonio's previous murder conviction be overturned. Téa succeeds in her goal of overturning Antonio's murder conviction. It is not long before Todd Manning (Howarth) notices her, seeing the asset in having her work for him. He hires Téa to defend Alex Olanov (Tonja Walker), and Téa is able to get Alex off without any prison time. Todd is further intrigued by Téa, just as Téa's romantic relationship with Kevin is about to end. Subsequently, she moves into an apartment with Rachel Gannon (then portrayed by Sandra P. Grant).

Blair Cramer (DePaiva), Todd's ex-wife, is injured in a car accident. While in rehab, she finds out it was Todd who set the explosion that blew up the Armitage yacht, killing Guy Armitage. The news triggers a stroke. She eventually falls into a coma. After being told by Blair's doctors she will not awaken from the coma, Todd takes action. Anxious to make sure his ex-wife's aunt, Dorian Lord (Robin Strasser), will not win custody of his daughter Starr (Kristen Alderson), Todd offers Téa five million dollars to marry him and to be his lawyer in the custody battle. Téa is flabbergasted; she never had much money. She agrees to the deal. While Blair is comatose, Téa gets full custody of Starr for Todd.

Months of emotional closeness follow for Todd and Téa, and Téa realizes she has developed romantic feelings for Todd. Todd, however, keeps Téa emotionally at a distance after realizing he, too, is harboring romantic feelings for her. Téa turns to Andrew Carpenter (Wortham Krimmer) for comfort and for the type of intimacy Todd will not give her. She had tried to seduce Todd into having sex with her, but he violently threw her out. Téa, though, quickly reasons she cannot have sex with Andrew because she is in love with Todd. Despite Téa's feelings for Todd, she asks Todd for a divorce. Todd refuses the divorce and is able to get Téa to agree to a four-week trial reconciliation.

Todd finally proposes to Téa. She happily accepts. Their happiness, however, is brief. Todd soon becomes a suspect in the murder of a woman named Georgie Phillips. He panics, and holds everyone suspected of killing Georgie (even ones not so suspected, such as his own sister, Viki) hostage at the Buchanan Lodge to get the murderer to confess. Rachel finally confesses to Georgie's murder. Todd runs off, trying to elude the police looking to arrest him. Téa follows Todd. She hopes she can reason with him, but he grabs her and forces her to come with him against her will. He takes her to the garden shed at Llanfair. When Téa verbally lashes out at Todd and mentions his rape of Marty Saybrooke (Haskell), Todd temporarily loses control of his temper and hits Téa. He then ties her up. The two continue to banter when she awakens, even sharing a brief kiss. Téa uses Todd's desire and love for her to trick him into untying her from the ropes binding her arms and legs. She knocks Todd out with a shovel, and later has him arrested.

Todd escapes soon after being locked in a jail cell. He seeks out his daughter to say goodbye to her, and corners Téa in a cabana. There, the two discuss Todd's inability to have sex with her. When Todd tries to initiate sex with her in response to this, Téa rejects him, saying it is too late. He should have trusted her more with his heart and his body. Todd becomes loud. The cops overhear, immediately encircling the building. Sam Rappaport (Kale Browne), Todd's former mentor and longtime father-figure, goes in to talk to Todd. He learns Todd was raped at age 14 by adoptive father Peter Manning. When Sam tries to introduce that fact in court, Todd collapses and goes into a catatonic state. When he awakens, he appears to have dissociative identity disorder (split personalities), like his sister Viki Lord (Erika Slezak). The personality called Tom, a more childlike and gentle personality, is in control and is determined to have Téa give him a second chance. She eventually admits she is still in love with Todd. More personalities show themselves later. A split personality named Pete is seen as being responsible for all of Todd's cruelest misdeeds. After an apparent "integration" of Todd's newfound "alters", Todd and Téa soon marry again. At the reception, Starr unknowingly has a tape played over the country club's loud speakers where Todd is heard confessing he has been faking the DID to avoid criminal prosecution. This happens as Todd and Téa are in the process of making love. Téa is naturally furious with Todd and leaves him to face off with Sam and Viki. Todd soon after kidnaps Téa and traps her in their cabana room. She says that he was supposed to truly love her. Todd says he does love her, but he cannot change. Téa tells him to get out of her life. He leaves. The room is set on fire, however, when Téa throws an object at one of the lit candles in the room. She tries to escape, but the door is jammed. Téa almost dies; Todd, with Sam at his side, is able to save her.

Todd prepares to leave town, but not before trying to convince Téa to come with him by leaving a letter for her in which somewhat expresses his feelings. Téa tears up the letter, refusing to return to Todd. Once back at Todd's empty penthouse on a mission to rid it of all of her belongings, her emotions get the best of her. She breaks down in memory of her past with Todd. Before Todd leaves, Sam asks Todd if he was truly raped as a young teenager. Todd's answer is ambiguous. The two share an emotional goodbye. Later in 1999, Téa files for divorce.

2000, 2002
In February 2000, Todd reappears in Llanview intent on taking Téa away with him. He visits with his daughter and gives her a note for Téa. Téa is reluctant to meet with Todd, but she does, at Viki's cabin. When he informs her he caused a gas leak, played mind games on the people of Llanview, and he was the one who had recently shot a gun at R.J. Gannon (Timothy D. Stickney), Téa's new boyfriend, due to his jealousy, all while having secretly watched her for months, Téa is beyond appalled. It is not until Todd tells her he had "been all over the world" trying to erase her from his mind and he could not, that she begins to understand his train of thought; it was his way of showing how deep his love runs for her. Having made his devotion known to her by telling her that he would make the world end for her, Todd brushes off the notion of typical love. He begs Téa to leave town with him, and although frustrated that Todd refuses to take this time to make love to her, Téa finally takes Todd's hand and leaves with him to start a new life.

In June 2000, Todd returns to Llanview, stating Téa left him. He soon seeks to once again start a romantic life with Blair. After much manipulation, he does. The two continue to have their ups and downs, though. Téa returns to town in 2002 for a brief visit. When she visits Todd, it is evident he is still hurt by her having left him. However, Todd has bigger problems. Blair is furious with him for his latest misdeeds, and has hired bodyguards to keep him away from their children. She and Sam secretly take the family away to Hawaii to get away from Todd, but the bodyguards are working for Todd. He follows them to Hawaii and plans to kidnap the kids. He runs into Téa there. Téa warns Blair about Todd's plans. Blair is able to bring Starr and Jack safely back to Llanview. Todd and Téa, meanwhile, are shipwrecked on a deserted island due to Todd's plan to kidnap his children having gone awry. They are not alone. Ross Rayburn, a man Todd had hired to help him with the kidnapping, is also stuck on the island with them, resulting in a love triangle as he and Todd vy for Téa's affections. Todd spies Téa kissing Ross and decides to leave the island alone. As he prepares for his voyage, Téa shows up and tells Todd she is in love with him and "it" has always been him for her. A wave of emotions come over Todd, and he tells Téa he wants to be with her, too. The two soon have sex for the first time, but a change in the weather threatens to ruin the couple's newfound happiness. During this time, Téa painfully realizes Todd is still in love with Blair when she sees he has kept a picture of her, though having earlier sworn he was through with that part of his life. Though hurt by this realization, Téa gives her blessing for Todd to romantically reunite with Blair. Desperate to get home to his family, Todd risks his life by getting on a makeshift raft and rowing out into the sea. He washes up on a beach in Guam, and from there makes his way back to Llanview. Téa and Ross are later rescued.

2008–12

Téa returns on December 5, 2008, to visit Todd (then portrayed by Trevor St. John), who is incarcerated due to imprisoning an amnesiac Marty for months. Téa begs him to let her help him, but he refuses. Todd eventually changes his mind, but Téa has an ulterior motive for returning to Llanview. She seeks to prove her other client, Ray Montez, had been framed for the murder of his first wife by the real killer, his second wife Vanessa (the real killer later turns out to be Ray's daughter, Lola).

Téa goes head-to-head with Nora in court, forcing Marty to admit on the stand she had not been literally held against her will. All the charges are dropped, but a furious Starr announces to the court her father had planned to steal her baby after birth before she could give it up for adoption. With Starr and corrupt nurse Lee Halpern as witnesses, the case seems solid. However, Téa plays upon Starr's worsening guilt over sending her own father to prison, and she changes her testimony. Téa finds Todd standing over a murdered Lee in his own house; Téa tells the police she killed Lee in self-defense. The police do not believe Téa to be guilty of the murder. With all evidence lost, Todd is cleared. With the threat of prosecution removed, Todd finally confesses to Marty and Starr his crimes against them. At Llanview's Go Red Ball, Todd and Téa get into a six-way altercation with John McBain, Blair, Marty, and a mysterious man named Wes Granger, who Marty has been staying with for the past few days. During the brawl, Wes pulls a knife on Todd. Later that night, Wes is found dead beside Marty, and she is accused. Although Marty is charged, it is also thought Todd may be the true killer. When Blair is found stabbed in her shower, Todd is arrested, as he was the first to find her. When Téa has become sick of Todd supposedly involved in every crime that comes up and of feeling she currently ranks third in comparison to Todd's former lovers (Blair and Marty), she quits as his lawyer.

Téa accepts Dorian's offer to represent Blair, who has just awoken from a coma, in a custody battle against Todd. She comes up with the "ultimate plan" — to get John to marry Blair to keep the kids away from Todd; the plan is successful in court. To get his kids back in turn, Todd comes up with a plan to seduce Téa. Although she turns him down, Todd is successful in getting her to have sex with him weeks later. Afterward, Todd thinks this signifies Téa's willingness to help him in his custody battle against Blair. Téa, however, reveals she has just "played" him. The next day, Todd learns John has been arrested, and heads to court to use this to win custody of his kids. Téa stalls Todd with a kiss and tells him she is just trying to keep him from getting to the judge. They have sex in the empty courtroom. Marty walks in afterward. Téa is upset when Todd runs after Marty, so she uses R.J. to make Todd jealous. It works. She and Todd end up sleeping together after Téa's date with R.J., and again on the morning of Todd and Blair's custody trial.

In May 2009, Powell Lord turns out to be the serial killer suspected of most of the recent town murders and Blair's stabbing. He and Rebecca Lewis, kidnap Todd, Blair and Téa. In a boiler room of the chosen kidnapping site, Blair and Téa believe they will die. Due to this, they reveal to each other Todd is the love of both their lives. Téa has an even deeper secret to tell Blair, but is not able to when Blair passes out. They later survive the kidnapping. Todd and Téa become especially close. In August, Blair suspects Téa is hiding something and hires Rex Balsom to investigate the time Téa was absent from Llanview. It is discovered she is married to Ross Rayburn. Ross seems to give Téa a divorce. Todd proposes marriage to Téa; Téa accepts, and they wed in October. She tells Todd how much she loves him as well and she never wants to lose him. Todd and Téa have a honeymoon night while Blair contemplates how to reveal to Todd his marriage to Téa is invalid. Todd does not believe her at first, but does after making calls. When Todd confronts Téa about it, he feels their relationship is over. As Téa suggests Ross and Blair must have somehow schemed to keep the divorce papers from being signed and she can sign them now and for Todd to give her another chance, Todd tells her no and it no longer matters. He screams he fell in love with and became a better person for her but he now believes she is more "rot" than he is. Téa leaves heartbroken and sets off to confront Blair.

Blair and Téa argue over the matter. Blair wonders what Téa is truly hiding. Téa admits she has been hiding the fact she has a child; guessing Todd is the father, Blair tries to force Téa to tell him, but Téa accidentally pushes Blair out of her bedroom window. Téa reveals to Rachel she and Todd share a daughter named Daniella and she only found out recently with a DNA test. Téa, aboard a plane to London to meet up with her daughter, tells Eli Clarke her daughter is Todd's and not Ross's. Eventually, Todd learns of Danielle's existence and desires to be a part of her life. However, after witnessing Todd shoot Ross, Danielle wants nothing to do with him. For the sake of her daughter, Téa ends her romance with Todd, but tries to push her daughter and Todd to have some kind of relationship.

Téa is diagnosed with an inoperable brain tumor, after collapsing in court. She conceals her condition from Danielle. She  goes to court to get Todd off, for the charge of pushing a pregnant Marty down a flight of stairs and causing her to miscarry, so Todd can care for Danielle after she dies. Blair learns of Téa's condition and places their differences aside to be by Téa's side. Subsequently, Blair convinces Téa to seek medical treatment for her tumor, which Téa initially protests, but eventually gives in. Shortly thereafter, Blair takes Téa to her first radiation treatment. Blair promises to make sure Danielle is a part of her family, once Téa dies, and she comforts Téa. Weeks later, Téa calls Blair over to ask Blair to be Danielle's legal guardian in case something happens to Todd; Blair promises to always be there for Danielle. Blair and Téa share a goodbye with a montage of some of their history together. When Todd and Danielle learned of her condition, and upon learning it was fatal, they protested Téa is not trying to save herself. With the limited time they believe they have left, Téa and Todd remarry for a fourth time. The next day, Téa tells Todd and Danielle she has checked herself into a hospice. She asks Blair to be a mom to Danielle. Days later, Téa arrives at the hospice St. Kitts and is looked after by Dr. Greg Evans and Shaun Evans. Téa supposedly dies on August 27, 2010. Todd and Dani fly over to St. Kitts to see Téa once more, but, once they arrive, they are told by Greg that Téa had died the night before. Todd and Dani return home to Llanview and go through her belongings. Dani's friends and Todd's family pay their respects to Téa. Later, Todd receives a vase in the mail from St. Kitts with Téa's ashes inside it.

Téa was later seen alive in a hospital room and Dr. Greg Evans attempts to tell Téa she is okay, but is stopped by Eli Clarke. When Téa wakes from her coma, Greg tells her she is not dying. Téa escapes from the clinic only to be kidnapped by Eli. Téa is shocked to learn Eli has also kidnapped Starr, Hope, and Dani. Starr and Hope escape. The police arrive to save Téa and Dani, but Eli causes an explosion in the warehouse; Téa and Dani survive and are reunited with Todd. In August 2011, it was revealed the man Téa was married to was actually Todd's twin brother Victor Lord Jr. and the real Todd Manning had been imprisoned for the last eight years. When the truth is revealed, Téa assures Victor he is the man she loves even though he is not really Todd Manning. The two have sex. Victor is shot by an unknown assailant and later dies in Téa's arms. Téa believes Todd when he said he did not kill Victor and defends him, Starr and her brother, Tomás. Téa gets Todd and Starr off and they are only sentenced to community service. In October, Téa thinks she might be pregnant with Victor's baby; a pregnancy test further confirms that Téa is indeed pregnant. On January 13, 2012, it is revealed that Téa's husband Victor Lord Jr. is alive and is secretly being held captive by Allison Perkins.

In May 2012, a heavily pregnant Téa arrives in Port Charles, the setting of General Hospital, to provide legal counsel to Starr, who had held mobster Sonny Corinthos at gun point. Téa quickly discloses that she was hired by Blair. On June 1, she collapses in the parking garage and is found by Todd, and goes into labor. Todd crashes their car off the road during a rainstorm and delivers Téa's baby, a boy, in the rain. When the baby is born, he is not crying and Todd takes the baby and goes for help. Todd runs into Heather Webber, who in turn says the baby is unable to be saved. As Todd goes to tell Téa the unfortunate news, he discovers Sam Morgan lying unconscious with her own healthy newborn son nearby. As Todd attempts to return Sam's baby to her, Téa arrives and falsely assumes the baby is hers. Heather leaves Téa's stillborn son in place of Sam's. Todd later returns Téa to Llanview with Sam's baby.

Heather Webber arrives in Llanview in September 2012 at Téa's house, introducing herself as "Susan Moore." She offers to be a nanny for the baby. Téa is thankful and hires her. John later arrives in Llanview, and secretly takes a DNA sample from the baby after Sam's husband, Jason, begins to suspect that Sam's baby was switched with Téa's. The DNA results are a match, and John goes to Llanview to tell Téa the truth. However, before he can tell her, Téa realizes that the baby and her nanny are gone. When John tells her that "Susan" is really Heather, a mental patient who escaped from Ferncliff, Téa is shocked. When Téa finds out that Heather is in Port Charles, she heads to Todd's house. Todd pretends to get a phone call from his P.I. telling him where Heather is, and he and Téa leave to go find her. When they get there, however, they find John there with Port Charles Commissioner Anna Devane. Téa listens as John and Anna punch holes in Todd's story, but is too worried about "her baby". Anna  gets a phone call that Heather is at General Hospital, holding the baby hostage on the roof. John, Anna, Todd, and Téa all head to General Hospital. Téa wants to go be with "her son", but John stops her. Todd stays with Téa, while John and Anna confer about the situation. Téa overhears them saying Sam and Jason are on the roof with Heather, and wonders why they are on the roof with Heather and "her son". Téa tries to go to the roof, but Todd stops her. Téa watches in horror as Heather jumps from the roof with the baby in her arms. However, Jason manages to save the baby.

Téa is relieved, and anxious to see her son, but is confused when Todd and Anna keep stopping her. Eventually, she runs inside, and Todd chases after her. She gets out of the elevator, and sees John with Jason, Sam, and the baby. When she goes to get him, John and Sam hold her back, and she becomes even more confused. When Sam and Jason walk away with the baby, Téa is furious and demands an explanation. John and Todd  explains to her that her baby died and the child with Sam and Jason is Sam's son. At first, Téa is in disbelief, thinking they're lying to her, but when John shows the DNA test that was run and tells her that the baby who died had hemophilia, a condition that's in Téa's family, Téa finally realizes her baby is dead. She goes to baby "Victor's" room, and tells Jason and Sam she will not take the baby away – she just wants to say goodbye. Sam agrees, and Téa says a heartfelt goodbye to "Victor". Afterwards, she leaves the room, and the hospital, in tears.

Téa comes to the police station after Todd is arrested in connection to the baby switch. Téa asks him flat out if he had anything to do with the switch. Todd denies it, but Téa warns him that if he did do this, he has hurt her more than he could ever have. She goes back to Llanview, but not before telling Starr about the suspicion surrounding Todd. Téa is shown in Llanview again with Blair, when Todd arrives with Carly Corinthos and Skye Quartermaine. Carly and Skye claim that Tomás is actually an international arms dealer named Lorenzo Alcazar. Blair calls Tomás to come home, but a CIA agent shows up, saying Tomás has left for another mission. Téa leaves with Blair and Skye to find Tomás.

2013
Téa is still mourning the loss of her son and finding it hard to focus on life. However, that evening, while attending the opening of Blair's new nightclub Shelter, Dani passes out and has to be taken to the hospital by Todd, Blair, and Téa. There, Téa finds out that Dani has been taking Oxycontin pills, which caused her to have an overdose at the club. Téa finds out Matthew knew, and she yells at him for not telling her. However, Todd yells at her for not realizing Dani was using. As Téa is arguing with him, Victor comes in and pushes Todd away from Téa. Téa reunites with Victor.

When Dani comes home later, she makes it clear that she feels like Téa has just been ignoring her. Victor finds the nursery, and Téa tells him about their baby and the switch. When Dani comes home after partying late at Shelter, Téa is furious, but Dani says she was not using. Téa makes it clear to Dani that she is going to be paying more attention to her.

Reception
Téa became one of One Life to Live's most popular characters. Her romantic pairing with Todd was described as "one of the hottest stories to hit daytime television". Fans enjoyed the union and dubbed them "TnT" (for Todd and Téa). The pairing's popularity was seen as equal to rival couple Todd and Blair. This created an intense rivalry between the two fanbases, which became known as the "T&B vs. TnT" wars, and were some of the genre's most notorious Internet battles. They left writers and producers with the task of deciding which couple would be the "true love" couple. In addition, viewers enjoyed the battles between Blair and Téa, which became one of soap opera's most entertaining rivalries. Although Todd and Téa were promoted as a dysfunctional pairing, they were prominently featured in commercials advertising their love story, voted "Best Couple" and "Best Romance" in soap opera magazines, and cited as "television at its best".

Howarth left the role of Todd in 1998. When he later returned as the character in 2000 for a one-week stint to persuade Téa to leave with him, it was one of the show's most anticipated events. He returned again as Todd later that year without Téa. When the return was first reported, fans queried whether Téa would be returning with the character. An emphatic "No!" was issued by Lozano's agent in what was deemed "an angry statement" to magazine Soaps in Depth. The agent added, "Give it up, guys! Stop calling!" Viewers wondered how the show would explain Téa no longer being with Todd, and heavily campaigned for the series to reunite the pairing. The writers had Todd explain that Téa had left him in the middle of the night, with a letter saying that she could no longer be with him. Determined not to be alone, Todd is soon seen going after Blair, wanting the family he once had with her. This did not deter fans of the Todd and Téa romance from campaigning for the couple. In 2002, their campaign was successful when Lozano agreed to return to the series for a brief stint. The opportunity to work with Howarth again was one of the reasons Lozano decided to return. "It's a lot of fun to work opposite Roger," she said. "There is so much going on beneath the surface."

The writers scripted Todd and Téa's reunion to take place following Blair, betrayed by Todd again, having left him; it was a live-week for the series, something that had not been done in almost twenty years in the history of soap opera. Soaps In Depth stated that with a shout-out to fans, Téa made her return entrance by stating, "I'm baaack!" with "a gleam in her eye" while interrupting Antonio and Carlotta Vega's bilingual bickering before visiting Todd. Not long after visiting Todd, the two are shipwrecked with one of Todd's employees after coming face to face for the first time in two years on a boat Todd had planned to use in order to kidnap his children from Blair. Regarding Todd and Téa being stranded together on a deserted island, former head writer Gary Tomlin, who was new to the series at the time, explained, "They both realize the mistakes they've made. Téa starts to see why she fell in love with him. The same thing for him. He's thinking that if they ever get off this island, they can go back and he can share his life with her — a life including his kids." While Todd does not declare his love for Téa, he "opens up" to Téa in "his own special way". Tomlin elaborated, "He makes the decision not to run away and deal with what he needs to deal with. [Todd and Téa were cast away in the first place because] we wanted to address Todd's relationship with the past." Tomlin further relayed, "It was also a way to finally satisfy Todd and Téa fans, who have been campaigning for a reunion since Florencia Lozano left the show in 2000. I don't know if Todd and Blair could have stayed together. Had he stayed in Llanview, it's possible that Téa would have come back, and we would have dealt with the situation in Llanview, with Blair being part of the dynamic."

Though Tomlin reunited Todd and Téa, seemingly having the pair on the path to their happy ending and scripting their first time having sex together (a long-awaited event by fans of the love story), he chose Todd and Blair as being the actual "true love" couple. This decision angered Todd and Téa fans, who expressed their anger through e-mails to the ABC network over Tomlin describing Todd's love for Blair as "the most genuine thing he has ever felt". Tomlin said that he had his reasons for telling the summer story the way he did and that the Todd and Téa fans have "convenient memories". He added, "When I went back to screen the Todd/Téa relationship — which everybody had said was so wonderful, that it was so this and so that, and they were so much in love — the thing that stuck out for me was when Todd punched Téa in the face and knocked her out. As a female viewer, I would have trouble getting past that. When you delve into physical abuse...it's a tough thing."

Todd being recast in 2003 with actor Trevor St. John after Howarth's departure from the series did not stop speculation that One Life to Live still planned to continue the Todd and Téa romance. In 2005, TV Guide reported the rumor, stating, "We recently came across an OLTL audition script for a scene between Todd and 'Lucia,' a woman who sounds a lot like his long-lost Latina legal eagle. So is a recast in the works? A show rep assures TVGuide.com that 'there are no plans to bring the character of Téa back to OLTL.'" It was surmised that if true, "Todd and Blair fans everywhere [could] breathe a major sigh of relief".

See also
Supercouple
Todd Manning and Marty Saybrooke rape storylines

Notes

References

External links
Character profile at ABC

Television characters introduced in 1997
One Life to Live characters
General Hospital characters
Crossover characters in television
Fictional lawyers
Fictional Hispanic and Latino American people
Fictional characters from New York City
Female characters in television